Wolf Dietrich Schneider (7 May 1925 – 11 November 2022) was a German journalist, author, and language critic. After World War II, he learned journalism on the job with Die Neue Zeitung, a newspaper published by the US military government. He later worked as a correspondent in Washington for the Süddeutsche Zeitung, then as editor-in-chief and from 1969 manager of the publishing house of Stern. He moved to the Springer Press in 1971. From 1979 to 1995, he was the first director of a school for journalists in Hamburg, shaping generations of journalists. He wrote many publications about the German language, becoming an authority. He promoted a concise style, and opposed anglicisms and the German orthography reform.

Life 
Schneider was born on 7 May 1925 in Erfurt and grew up in Berlin. Having passed his Abitur, he served with the Luftwaffe until the end of the Second World War. His post-war career began as a translator for the US Army, and in 1947 he joined the Munich-based Neue Zeitung, a newspaper run by the US military government. It was here that he received journalistic training and later worked as an editor. In the early 1950s Schneider was a correspondent for the news agency AP; in later years he was in charge of the news team and correspondent in Washington for the Süddeutsche Zeitung.

In 1966, Schneider joined Stern magazine, where he worked as editor-in-chief, and from 1969 as manager of the publishing house. German media tycoon Axel Springer hired Schneider in 1971 to design the news magazine Dialog, aimed at challenging Der Spiegels dominant position in the German market. The project ended in failure, however, and Schneider was appointed editor-in-chief of Springer's conservative daily Die Welt, based in Hamburg. Springer dismissed Schneider after only one year.

Schneider remained at Springer as editor-in-chief without portfolio. In 1979, he was appointed the inaugural director of the newly founded Hamburger Journalistenschule, which later became known as Henri-Nannen-Schule. He was to hold this position until 1995. He taught hundreds of students, many of whom are now in prominent positions. He also became widely known during this time as the godfather of concise German prose.

Schneider was married and a father of three children. He lived in Starnberg, where he died on 11 November 2022 at the age of 97.

Language critic 
From 1995, Schneider was a vigorous lecturer on the German language, and gave seminars for press officers and young journalists. He was a prolific writer and produced 28 best-selling nonfiction books, among them staple works on proper German style (e.g. "German for life. What school forgot to teach"). His last works were "Speak German", a defence of the German language in the face of anglicisms, and Man: a Career, which tells the story of mankind's rise to mastery of the earth, and plots our uncertain future.

Schneider's ideal was a concise written style, avoiding the typically-German pitfalls of rambling sentences, separated verbs, and complex constructions. Schneider was a critic of the German orthography reform and founded with others the pressure group  (Living German). Schneider opposed gender neutrality in the German language.

Awards 
Schneider received several prizes, including the Henri Nannen Prize for his life's work, and the media prize for language culture (Medienpreis für Sprachkultur) of the Gesellschaft für deutsche Sprache. He held a chair as honorary professor at the University of Salzburg.

Publications

Language

Journalism

Other topics 
 Überall ist Babylon. Die Stadt als Schicksal der Menschen von Ur bis Utopia. Econ, Düsseldorf 1960
 

 
 
 
 
 
 Die Sieger: wodurch Genies, Phantasten und Verbrecher berühmt geworden sind. Gruner und Jahr, Hamburg 1992; Taschenbuchauflage: Piper-TB 2217, München / Zürich 1996, .
 
 
 
 
 
 
 Denkt endlich an die Enkel. Eine letzte Warnung, bevor alles zu spät ist. Rowohlt Verlag, Hamburg 2019.

Autobiography

References

Further reading

External links 

 
 Official website 

1925 births
2022 deaths
German male journalists
German newspaper journalists
20th-century German journalists
21st-century German journalists
Journalism teachers
Academic staff of the University of Salzburg
Writers from Erfurt
Süddeutsche Zeitung people
Die Welt editors
Norddeutscher Rundfunk people
Luftwaffe personnel of World War II
Officers Crosses of the Order of Merit of the Federal Republic of Germany